Speakeasy Comics was a Canadian publishing company of comic books and graphic novels which operated from 2004–2006. Based in Toronto, Ontario, Speakeasy published monthly comics, creator-owned independent series, original graphic novels, and collected out-of-print creator-owned comics series that had originated with other companies. Its best-known titles were Atomika, Beowulf, The Grimoire, and Rocketo.

Although Speakeasy made a big public relation splash and announced a large lineup of monthly titles, it had trouble almost from the beginning in following through with its plans. Warren Ellis characterized the short-lived company as "one publisher getting it wrong from start to finish: releasing too many books, without a support structure, releasing comics without a dedicated marketing plan."

History

Beginnings 
Adam Fortier founded Speakeasy Comics In August 2004. (Previously, Fortier had worked for comics publishers Dreamwave Productions — where he revived the Transformers licence in comics — Devil's Due Publishing, UDON, and IDW Publishing.)

In March 2005, the company published its first titles, the debut issues of Atomika and The Grimoire.

In a sign of trouble to come, however, that same month, Yoshitaka Amano's Hero, a highly anticipated graphic novel, was cancelled and postponed one year. It was resolicited in February 2006 for tentative publication in April 2006, but cancelled again in May 2006. (It is now being published by Boom! Studios.)  In October 2005, creator Frank Espinosa announced the moving of his Rocketo series to Image Comics.

In November 2005, Speakeasy announced it had concluded a financing deal with Los Angeles-based Ardustry Entertainment: Speakeasy would now also develop comics based on licenses brought by Ardustry, while Ardustry would represent Speakeasy's comics properties in the entertainment industry (movies, videogames, etc.)

Troubles 
Also in November 2005, Speakeasy-owned titles Beowulf, The Grimoire and Spellgame went through several creative team changes. In that same period, only a few months after signing with the publisher, Atomika creator Sal Abbinanti split from Speakeasy to self-publish future issues Atomika. under his own Mercury Comics label.

In December 2005, Speakeasy canceled orders on two months' of previously ordered comics. Creator allegations of non-payment and mismanagement of projects started circulating.

Speakeasy published no titles in January 2006. That month, creator Sal Cipriano announced he had cancelled his Bio Boy series, but was keeping The Hill there. Creator Matt Maxwell announced he had amicably parted with Speakeasy for his Strangeways series. Four issues had been solicited but never published.

Also in January, Chimaera Studios announced they were moving their eight series — Mutation, Of Bitter Souls, Super Crazy TNT Blast [renamed Twilight Men], Smoke & Mirror, Lonebow, Wargod, Project Eon, and Silent Ghost — from Speakeasy to the British publisher Markosia. Creators Jose Torres and Chris Dibari announced they were also moving their series The Hunger to Markosia.

In addition, Jonathan Martin's Speakeasy Comics Archive (a blog dedicated to Speakeasy-related news) was shut down, presumably under "trademark infringement" litigation.

In February 2006, creators of the series O.C.T. - the Occult Crimes Taskforce announced their move to Image Comics.

Closure 
On February 27, 2006, Vito Delsante, Speakeasy's "unofficial" public relations director, announced via email the immediate closure of Speakeasy, with all March-solicited books still shipping, April and May's being tentative, and June's being cancelled. The company, however, didn't file for bankruptcy, officially in order to try to pay its outstanding bills.

Comics reporter Tom Spurgeon charactered the company's demise this way: "... right now you have to have sustainable capital, publishing skill, marketing ability, something some people want, and enough perspective to let those factors and not personal ambition define the enterprise. I didn't see any of that with Speakeasy...."

It was later revealed (according to Ardustry Entertainment's business affairs manager, Wayne Williams) that the November 2005 deal between Speakeasy and Ardustry had only been an option to buy Speakeasy, which expired without materialization. Cash-flow problems led to Speakeasy's demise before they could materialize various lucrative licensing deals, such as with HBO (The Sopranos and Deadwood).

Speakeasy intended to collect some series in trade paperbacks (such as Atomika, Grimoire, and Beowulf), but all solicited TPBs were eventually cancelled. In March 2006, only Beowulf #7 was published. In May 2006, Diamond Comic Distributors's monthly list of cancelled comics listed all the remaining unpublished Speakeasy comics, with the terminal cancel code 10 ("Supplier Out of Business").

Publications

Monthly titles 
 Athena Voltaire: Flight of the Falcon #1
 Beowulf #1–7
 Butternutsquash #1 (Nov. 2005) — webcomic planned for quarterly publication; only issue published as part of a plan to publish quarterly
 Elk's Run #4 — creator-owned series
 Gatesville Company #1-2
 The Grimoire #1-7
 Helios: In With the New #1-2
 Hero At Large #1-2
 Phantom Jack: The Nowhere Man Agenda #1 — creator-owned series
 Spellgame #1-3

Cancelled/debuted with other publishers 
 O.C.T. — the Occult Crimes Taskforce
 Project Eon
 Silent Ghost
 Superunknown
 Strangeways

Moved to other publishers 
 Adventures of Bio Boy #1-2 — series continued with another publisher
 Atomika #1-4 — moved to Mercury Comics
 The Hunger #1-5 — moved to Markosia
 Lonebow #1 — moved to Markosia
 Mutation #1-3 — moved to Markosia
 Of Bitter Souls #1-3 — moved to Markosia
 Rocketo #1-6 — moved to Image Comics
 Smoke & Mirror #1-2 — moved to Markosia
 Super Crazy TNT Blast #1 — moved to Markosia
 Wargod #1 — moved to Markosia

Graphic novels/graphic novellas 
 The Flying Friar by Rich Johnston
 The Living And The Dead by Todd Livingston and Robert Tinnell
 Parting Ways: the Near Life Experiences of Peter Orbach by Andrew Foley
 Ravenous by Dawn Brown

Collections 
 2020 Visions #1-12 — previously serialized at DC/Vertigo
 Elk's Run #1-3 Collected Edition — previously self-published
 Phantom Jack (first miniseries) #1-5 — previously serialized at Image Comics

Circulation
Based on pre-order sales through Diamond Comic Distributors reported by industry resource site ICv2, Speakeasy's top-selling monthly comics during its period of operation were:

 (2005.03) 7,756 copies (rank 190) for Atomika #1
 (2005.04) 6,116 copies (rank 187) for Atomika #2
 (2005.05) 3,305 copies (rank 213) for Grimoire #3
 (2005.06) 5,726 copies (rank 231) for Atomika #3
 (2005.07) 3,717 copies (rank 208) for Beowulf #3
 (2005.08) 6,381 copies (rank 203) for Atomika #4
 (2005.09) 2,019 copies (rank 251) for Smoke & Mirror #1
 (2005.10) 2,946 copies (rank 250) for The Grimoire #6
 (2005.11) 3,130 copies (rank 248) for Beowulf #5
 (2005.12) 2,463 copies (rank 273) for The Grimoire #7
 (2006.01) -- no comics published this month
 (2006.02) 2,718 copies (rank 246) for Beowulf #6
 (2006.03) -- one issue published but not ranked in Top 300 (i.e. less than 2,632 copies)
 (2006.04) -- no comics published this month
 (2006.05) -- no comics published this month

References

Sources consulted 
 Ellis, Jonathan. "Speaking Easy with Adam Fortier," PopImage (Jan. 2005).
 Lander, Randy. "Spotlight on Speakeasy Comics" The Fourth Rail (Dec. 5, 2005) — overview of Speakeasy's output at the end of 2005
 Gonzalez, Guy LeCharles. "Speakeasy Shakes Things Up," Buzzscope (Dec. 2005).
 MacDonald, Heidi. "The Class of 2005: A Tough Year for Comics Start-Ups," Publishers Weekly (Jan. 2006) — look at Alias' and Speakeasy's problems
 Weiland, Jonah. "Speakeasy Comics Shuts Its Doors, Fortier Speaks" Comic Book Resources (Feb. 27, 2006).
 Doane, Alan David. "The Rise and Inevitable Fall of Speakeasy Comics,"  Comics Book Galaxy (Feb. 28, 2006)
 "Speakeasy Closes Its Doors" February–March 2006 discussion between comics pros (at Warren Ellis' forum The Engine)
 MacDonald, Heidi. "Speakeasy Comics Shuts Down," Publishers Weekly (Mar. 7, 2006)

Footnotes

External links
 Speakeasy Comics.com (cached, from April 2005)
 

Defunct comics and manga publishing companies
Comic book publishing companies of Canada
Companies established in 2004